This is a list of diplomatic missions in Boston (and surrounding environs of "Greater" or "Metro-Boston"). These countries have established a resident consular presence to provide diplomatic and trade representation.

Consulates

Boston

Cambridge
The city of Cambridge is located very close to downtown Boston, directly across the Charles River.

Newton
The city of Newton is a suburban community which borders the western side of the Boston neighborhoods of Allston-Brighton.

Quincy
The city of Quincy borders the southern edge of the Boston neighborhood of Dorchester.

Honorary consulates
All honorary consulates are in Boston proper unless otherwise indicated.

 (in Newton)
 (in Lowell)

 (in Cambridge)
 (in Wellesley)

 (in Needham)

 (in Cambridge)

 (in Dedham)

 (in Needham)
 (in Andover)

 (in Belmont)

 (in Springfield)
 
 (in Millis)
 (in Cohasset)
 (in Concord)
 (in Dedham)
 (in Weston)

Source: Massachusetts Executive Office of Housing and Economic Development

Missions and representative offices in Boston
, Ministry of International Relations (Quebec) – Québec Government Offices
, Economic and Cultural Office

See also
List of diplomatic missions in the United States

References

Boston-related lists
Massachusetts-related lists
Organizations based in Boston